Kha with inverted breve (Х̑ х̑; italics: Х̑ х̑) is a letter of the Cyrillic script.

Kha with inverted breve is used in the Aleut language, where it represents the voiceless uvular fricative . It corresponds to Latin letter X with circumflex (X̂ x̂ X̂ x̂).

See also
Cyrillic characters in Unicode

Cyrillic letters with diacritics
Letters with breve